
Runamo is a cracked dolerite dike in Sweden that was for centuries held to be a runic inscription and gave rise to a famous scholarly controversy in the 19th century. It is located 2.7 km from the church of Bräkne-Hoby in Blekinge, in South-Sweden. For hundreds of years people said it was possible to read an inscription, and learned men referred to it.

As early as the 12th century, the Danish chronicler Saxo Grammaticus reported in the introduction to his Gesta Danorum that the runic inscription was no longer legible being too worn down. This had been established by a delegation sent by the Danish king Valdemar I of Denmark (1131–1182) to read the inscription:

Later in book 7 of Gesta Danorum, Saxo explains that it was a memorial by the Danish king Harald Wartooth to his father's great deeds:

In spite of Saxo's report that the inscription was illegible as early as the 12th century, the Danish physician and antiquary Ole Worm declared in the 17th century that he had managed to read four letters in the description: Lund.

There was considerable interest in the inscription during the Gothicismus of the early 19th century. The Swedish writer Esaias Tegnér referred to it in his unfinished poem on the giantess Gerðr and Axel who became bishop Absalon of Lund.

In 1833, the Royal Danish Academy of Sciences and Letters sent an expedition led by an Icelandic professor at the University of Copenhagen named Finnur Magnússon. The mission was to explore the signs making use of geological and artistic expertise, including the geologist Johan Georg Forchhammer. At first, Finnur was unable to read the signs, but resolving to read them from right to left and by interpreting most of them as bind runes, he believed he discerned a poem. This poem was an incantation by Harald Hildekinn, i.e. Harald Wartooth, for victory against the Swedish king Sigurd Hring at the Battle of Brávellir, or stanzas from the skaldic poem that the champion Starkad composed on the battle.

Finnur's report prompted Swedish scientist Jöns Jacob Berzelius to undertake his own study in 1836, and he concluded that the inscription was nothing but natural cracks in the rock. Finnur defended his thesis in an extensive publication in 1841, but the Danish archaeologist Jens Jacob Asmussen Worsaae made a third study at the location in 1844, which turned the general scholarly opinion towards Berzelius' theory. Since then, it is generally considered to be a dolerite dike with fractures.

See also

Notes

Bibliography
Andersson, Ingvar. (1947). Skånes historia, till Saxo och Skånelagen. P.A. Norstedt & söners förlag/Stockholm.
Brate, Eric. (1922). Sveriges runinskrifter, online.
Magnusen, Finn. (1841). Runamo og runerne. København. 
Saxo Grammaticus. Gesta Danorum, English Book I-IX: Medieval and Classical Literature Library
The article Runamo in Nationalencyklopedin (1995).
The article Runamo in Nordisk familjebok (1916).

Runic inscriptions
Archaeological errors
Scandinavian archaeology
Rock formations of Europe
Blekinge
Magmatic dikes